Khawas Khan Marwat was one of the best generals of Sher Shah Suri, having played a major role in defeating the Mughal Emperor Humayun in 1539 at the Battle of Chausa. He belonged to the Bahram branch of the Marwat tribe. He was originally a poor fox hunter, but Sher Shah spotted his potential and elevated him to the position of a general. According to historical accounts he was born of a slave woman to a household of Lohani Marwats.

After victory in the Battle of Sammel, Khawas Khan Marwat took possession of Jodhpur and occupied the territory of Marwar from Ajmer to Mount Abu in 1544. When Hamayun fled from Agra towards Multan, Sher Shah dispatched Khawas Khan and the greater part of his army to pursue him and drive him beyond the borders of India. The Mughal division which had quit Hamayun and was marching toward Kabul, encountered Khawas Khan and not being strong enough, fled. He then rejoined Sher Shah. Sher Shah built Rohtas Fort in Jehlum to keep down Gakhars and to block Emperor Humayun's return to India, and appointed Khawas Khan the administrative head of the fort.

Revolt against Islam Shah and Death
Khawas Khan along with eminent nobles like Qutb Khan Naib, Isa Khan Niazi, and Jal Khan Julwani stood against Islam Shah Suri in support of Adil Khan.  Adil Khan revolted and, accompanied by Khawas Khan, proceeded to attack Agra, but he was defeated in a battle outside the town. He fled to Panna and was not heard of again. Khawas Khan also fled towards Sarhind.

Islam Shah tried to kill all those nobles who were supposed to be in sympathy with Adil Khan. Haibat Khan Niazi revolted against the Sultan. Khawas Khan also came and joined him. Islam Shah went himself to suppress this revolt. He met the rebels near Ambala in 1547. Khawas left Haibat Khan on the eve of the battle because he wanted to fight in the name of Adil Khan while Haibat Khan was fired with the ambition to be crowned. The Niazis were defeated and Islam Shah pursued them up to the bank of the Jhelum River. He left an army to suppress the fugitives and himself returned to Agra. Subsequently, Khawas Khan who had taken refuge in Kumaun was lured into a trap and killed by Islam Shah. (A.D. 1552)

See also
Sher Shah Suri
Islam Shah Suri
Marwat
Rohtas Fort

References

External links
Khawas Khan, a Marwat or house-born slave of Sher Shah Suri?
Herbert Edwardes's description of Marwats (1848-49)
Marwat uprising against the Sikhs (1847)

Indian people of Pashtun descent
1552 deaths
Year of birth unknown